"Ride or Die" is a song by American EDM duo The Knocks featuring American indie pop band Foster the People, it was released on March 9, 2018 from The Knocks' second studio album New York Narcotic. The song was written by Styalz Fuego, Benjamin Ruttner and Mark Foster, the lead singer of Foster the People, and produced by The Knocks.

Music video
The music video was released on June 18, 2018, and directed by Kenny Laubbacher. It showcases the duo "chasing their Hollywood dreams". The Knocks explained to Billboard: "Writing the song, we wanted to create a warm nostalgic sound that centered around the idea of friendship and celebration. When our friend Kenny Laubbacher approached us with the idea of shooting a music video based on classic movie duos...our love for nostalgic movies and referencing classic imagery made it a no brainer."

Track listing

Charts

Weekly charts

Year-end charts

References

2018 singles
2018 songs
The Knocks songs
Foster the People songs
Songs written by Mark Foster (singer)
Atlantic Records singles